The Reykjavík Index for Leadership is a measure of how society perceives women and men in terms of their suitability for leadership, exploring how comfortable society is overall with female leadership. It was launched in 2018 as a partnership between Women Political Leaders and Kantar, with the Index being presented for the first time by Michelle Harrison at the 2018 Global Women Leaders Forum in Reykjavík. 

The Index is designed to “better understand where there is prejudice in society’s perceptions of women and men in leadership, across 23 economic sectors”. It also gives insight into differences in attitudes between women and men and between age groups. 

The methodology used to determine the Index is constructed based on research exploring the question, who is most suited to leadership positions: men, women or both equally?.
The 2018/2019 and 2019/2020 reports cover the G7. 

The 2020/2021 report covers the G7 countries, as well as India, Kenya and Nigeria.

Background 
Women Political Leaders and Kantar first partnered in 2018 to create the Reykjavík Index for Leadership. The first report was published in November 2018, the second in November 2019 and the third in November 2020. The next Reykjavík Index for Leadership report will be published in November 2021. The Reykjavík Index findings are presented each year in November at Women Political Leaders’ annual summit in Iceland, the Reykjavík Global Forum – Women Leaders. Women Political Leaders co-host the conference with the Government and Parliament of Iceland. They have also been shared during the World Economic Forum in Davos, UNGA and G7 summits. 

The Reykjavík Index for Leadership is the first to measure the extent to which prejudice towards women and men in leadership prevails within the G7 countries and India, Kenya and Nigeria, providing a global view on this issue across different societies. 
The aim of The Reykjavík Index of Leadership is to quantify levels of comfort in society with the prospect of female leadership and to provide evidence of attitudes about equality to policy makers, business leaders and civil society.

Dimensions 
The Reykjavík Index for Leadership investigates society’s attitudes towards leadership on a national level, but also looks at the dissonance between women and men and differences between age groups in the countries studied. It also offers a view of differences between the Index scores of different sectors at a country level.

National level research 
The Index provides national level Index scores of the researched countries which can be compared over time. The national scores also allow for comparison between country-level scores as well as the calculation of a G7 average score.

Dissonance between men and women 
An Index score is provided for women and men, across sectors and at a country level. This provides insight into the differences in attitudes of women and men towards equality in leadership. This difference is known as the dissonance.

Differences between age groups 
Reykjavík Index scores are provided for the first time by age groups in the 2020/2021 report. This allows for comparison between age groups. 

The age groups are split into 18-34, 35-54- and 55-65-year old for all countries. An average for all age groups is calculated for the G7 group.

Sector differences at a country level 
The 23 sectors that the Reykjavík Index for Leadership includes are: 

 Aerospace 

 Architecture

 Automotive Manufacture 

 Banking and Finance

 Charity and Not-for Profit 

 Childcare

 Defense and Police

 Economics and Political Science

 Education

 Engineering

 Fashion and Beauty

 Food and Drink Manufacture

 Foreign Affairs and Diplomacy

 Gaming 

 Government and Politics 

 Healthcare and Wellbeing

 High-Tech and Artificial Intelligence 

 Intelligence Services

 International Sports Organizations

 Judiciary

 Media and Entertainment

 Natural Sciences

 Pharmaceutical and Medical Research

The Reykjavík Index for Leadership 2020/2021 results 
The Reykjavík Index for Leadership provides a score up to 100 at the country level. A score of 100 would indicate the absence of any gender based prejudice towards leaders. Scores below that describe a measure of prejudice towards women leaders. Scores in the 2020/2021 study were for the G7 countries:

G7 average: 73

UK: 81; Canada: 81; USA: 76; France: 74; Italy: 68; Japan: 68; Germany 66

The scores for India, Kenya and Nigeria were:

India: 68; Kenya: 53; Nigeria: 47

Political and business advocates 
The Reykjavík Index has featured in global events where political and business leaders have spoken to its utility and insights including:

 Jose Manuel Barroso, Prime Minister of Portugal (2002-2004), President of the European Commission (2004-2014), Chair of the Board, Gavi, The Vaccine Alliance

 Hanna Birna Kristjansdottir, Senior Advisor on Women’s Leadership, UN Women

 Stephanie Buscemi, Salesforce CMO

 Ann Cairns, Vice Chair, Mastercard

 Helen Clark, Prime Minister of New Zealand (1999-2008); Administrator of the United Nations Development Programme (2009-2017)

 Obiageli Ezkwesili, Federal Minister of Education, Nigeria (2006-2007), former World Bank Vice President for Africa

 Peter Limbourg, Director General of Deutsche Welle

 Christy Tanner, Executive Vice President and General Manager of CBS News Digital

 Hiltrud Werner, Head, Integrity and Legal Affairs at Volkswagen

 Saadia Zahidi, Head, Centre for the New Economy and Society, Member of the Managing Board, World Economic Forum   
Uzra Zeya, Under Secretary of State for Civilian Security, Democracy, and Human Rights of the United States   
Jane Geraghty, Global CEO, Landor and Fitch   
Anne-Birgitte Albrectsen, CEO Plan International

Methodology 
The Reykjavík Index for Leadership has been constructed based on research exploring the question: “For each of the following sectors or industries, do you think men or women are better suited to leadership positions?”. This question allows responses of ‘men’, ‘women’ or ‘both equally’ for 23 different economic and professional sectors.”

A response of ‘both equally’ results in a point for that country within the Index, while a response of ‘men better suited’, ‘women better suited’ or ‘don't know’ does not.

A country’s Reykjavík Index for Leadership is equal to the average proportion of people selecting ‘both equally’ across the 23 economic sectors. This is a measure of the extent to which, across society, men and women are viewed to be equally suitable for leadership. For consistency between countries, the views of men and the views of women have each been given a 50% weight rather than a weight based on their exact population share (which varies slightly between countries). Similarly, the G7-wide version of The Reykjavík Index weights each constituent country equally.

References

External links 

 The Reykjavik Index for Leadership: The role of evidence on the journey to equality. Koch-Mehrin, Silvana, OECD Forum Network, 2019.
 Women Political Leaders - Reykjavik Index for Leadership. Penn Law, 2020.
Have female CEOs coped better with Covid than men?. Goswami, Nina, BBC, 2020.
 Young People Less Comfortable With Women Leaders, Poll Shows. Meakin, Lucy, Bloomberg, 2020.
 Women leaders? Youth found to be more prejudiced than older people. Batha, Emma, Reuters, 2020.

International rankings